Smithland is a historic house in Natchez, Mississippi, USA.

History
The land was acquired by Calvin Smith in the late 18th century, who gave it to his son, Benijah Smith, in the early 19th century.

Smithland was built as a great house on a plantation from 1815 to 1817. It was designed in the Federal architectural style.

The house was purchased by John H. Thorn in 1834. When it was remodelled in 1845, it was redesigned in the Greek Revival architectural style. By the 1980s, the house still belonged to Thorn's descendants.

Heritage significance
It has been listed on the National Register of Historic Places since April 2, 1987.

References

Houses on the National Register of Historic Places in Mississippi
Greek Revival houses in Mississippi
Houses completed in 1817
Houses in Adams County, Mississippi
Plantations in Mississippi
Antebellum architecture